Button  coral may refer to several different taxa:

 Cynarina lacrymalis, a species of coral
 Gymnophyllum wardi, an extinct species of coral
 either species of the genus Rhombopsammia